Debora Serracchiani (born 10 November 1970) is an Italian politician. Born in Rome, she is a member of Democratic Party, and was president of the Italian region of Friuli-Venezia Giulia. In 2016, she proposed and got the approval of a regional law which officially abolished provinces of the Friuli Venezia Giulia, moving their competences to the lower and the upper administrative level, which were respectively the Italian comune and the region. Friuli Venezia Giulia was the first region to implement the 2014 Delrio national law.

Serracchiani served as a Member of the European Parliament (MEP) of the European Parliament from 2008-13 as a member of the PD. She was also a member of the Progressive Alliance of Socialists and Democrats, an alliance within the European Parliament. As a MEP and regional leader of the Democratic Party (PD), she narrowly defeated incumbent President Renzo Tondo of The People of Freedom (PdL) 39.4% to 39.0% in the Friuli-Venezia Giulia regional election held on 21–22 April 2013, and she took office on 22 April 2013. Serracchiani is the second woman to hold the office of President of Friuli-Venezia Giulia, since  of Lega Nord Friuli (LNF) from 1994–95.

Serracchiani is Director of Institutional Relations of the Italy-USA Foundation.

References

1970 births
Living people
Politicians from Rome
Presidents of Friuli-Venezia Giulia
MEPs for Italy 2009–2014
21st-century women MEPs for Italy
Democratic Party (Italy) MEPs
Progressive Alliance of Socialists and Democrats MEPs